Thomas Leslie Green (12 April 1900 – 18 February 1974) was a Welsh-born professional golfer.

Green was born in Prestatyn on the north Wales coast where his father, Leslie, was a golf professional. Leslie was the professional at Colwyn Bay where Tom was later an assistant.

Green was professional at Copt Heath (to 1933), Burnham Beeches (1934–1945), Leamington and County (from 1947) and Stinchcombe Hill. While at Copt Heath, he was runner-up in the 1929 Midland Professional Championship and then the winner in 1930 and 1931. In 1936, he tied for 5th place in the Open Championship. After three rounds he had been just one stroke behind the leaders but a final round 75 dropped him down the order.

He represented England in the 1935 England–Scotland Professional Match but was later a member of the first professional Welsh teams in 1937 and 1938.

Professional wins
1930 Midland Professional Championship
1931 Midland Professional Championship

Results in major championships

Note: Green only played in The Open Championship.

CUT = missed the half-way cut
"T" indicates a tie for a place

Team appearances
England–Scotland Professional Match (representing England): 1935 (winners)
Triangular Professional Tournament (representing Wales): 1937
Llandudno International Golf Trophy (representing Wales): 1938

References

Welsh male golfers
People from Prestatyn
Sportspeople from Denbighshire
1900 births
1974 deaths